Francis H. Jardeleza (born September 26, 1949) is a former Associate Justice of the Supreme Court of the Philippines. He served as Solicitor General of the Philippines from 2012 to 2014, and was appointed by President Benigno Aquino III to the High Court on August 19, 2014.

Background

Jardeleza grew up in Jaro, Iloilo City, where he finished his elementary and secondary education. He earned his Bachelor of Arts degree in Political Science from the University of the Philippines Visayas in 1970. He earned his law degree at the University of the Philippines College of Law at UP Diliman, where he graduated as salutatorian in 1974. As a student at UP Law, Jardeleza was Vice-Chairperson of the Philippine Law Journal. He was admitted to the bar in 1974, having placed third in the bar examinations held that year. In 1977, Jardeleza obtained a Masters of Law degree from Harvard Law School.

Professional career

Jardeleza was in private practice until 1996, including a long-term stint at the ACCRA Law Offices. In 1996, he was named Senior Vice-President and General Legal Counsel of San Miguel Corporation. He remained with San Miguel Corporation until 2010.

Government service

In July 2010, Jardeleza was appointed Deputy Ombudsman for Luzon by President Benigno Aquino III. On February 6, 2012, Jardeleza's appointment as Solicitor General of the Philippines was announced, following the resignation of Jose Anselmo Cadiz. He took his oath of office as Solicitor General on February 20, 2012.

On 19 August 2014, President Aquino appointed Jardeleza as an Associate Justice of the Supreme Court of the Philippines, succeeding retired Justice Roberto Abad.

On 26 September 2019, Jardeleza retired upon reaching his 70th birthday.

In academia

Jardeleza has been a professorial lecturer at the University of the Philippines College of Law since 1993, teaching constitutional law among other subjects. His wife, Concepion Lim-Jardeleza is also a professor in said law school.

References

1949 births
Living people
Associate Justices of the Supreme Court of the Philippines
Solicitors General of the Philippines
20th-century Filipino lawyers
People from Iloilo City
University of the Philippines Visayas alumni
University of the Philippines Diliman alumni
Harvard Law School alumni
Benigno Aquino III administration personnel
Academic staff of the University of the Philippines
San Miguel Corporation people
Visayan people
21st-century Filipino judges